Haraze often known as Am Harazé or Haraze Mangueigne is a town and capital of the Haraze Mangueigne Department in the Salamat Region of eastern Chad.

Transport
The town is served by Haraze Airport.

Populated places in Chad
Salamat Region